Ravensthorpe is an area of Dewsbury, in West Yorkshire, England. Historically part of the West Riding of Yorkshire, Ravensthorpe is on the western outskirts of Dewsbury and is part of the "Dewsbury West" ward in the district of Kirklees.The area has always been heavily industrial and was once bustling with textile mills.

History

Despite its appearance, Ravensthorpe is not in fact a Norse name, but was coined in the 19th century by a local clergyman and historian to fit in with other Norse-named settlements in the area. It was formerly called Newtown and a large gasworks was built here in 1857. Ravensthorpe did not exist as a community until the middle of the 19th century when large numbers of houses were constructed alongside the new textile mills. The Church of St Saviour was built in 1864 but was replaced in 1901 by a large  Gothic revival church (Grade II listed).

Before the building of textile mills in the 1870s the main economic activity in the area was the production of malt for the brewing industry and coke production based around the mine in the Shill Bank area.

Following the Second World War, large areas of Ravensthorpe were demolished as part of the slum clearance programme. A brief poem from the time read.

Ravensthorpe, Ravensthorpe, what are they doing to you? They're knocking down the houses and building far too few.

There is a railway station in Ravensthorpe, off Calder Road, opened in the 19th century, near the Thornhill Power Station. The station is on the Huddersfield Line and has a regular service to Huddersfield, Dewsbury and Leeds.

Recent times

From the 1960s onwards, immigrants moved into the area, especially from Pakistan. More recently, there has been a large immigration of Iraqi-Kurds, Hungarians and Romas (Gypsies) into the area. 

There were riots in February 2008, Pakistani and White British males began rioting against the Kurdish community in retaliation for a group attack by Kurds on a local English man. In 2007 riots began between Asians and Roma, allegedly due to the fact that Roma were giving the area a bad reputation. After these riots, the population of Central Europeans (mostly Hungarians) decreased significantly. Pakistanis are still the majority ethnic group living in Ravensthorpe. In 2008, a new shopping park was built next to the gyratory. Ravensthorpe is also home to the Dewsbury Bus Museum located on Foundry Street.

See also
Listed buildings in Dewsbury

References

Heavy Woollen District
Geography of Dewsbury